Ayu Fani Damayanti was the defending champions having won the event in 2011, but decided not to participate in the singles event.

Noppawan Lertcheewakarn won the gold medal, defeating Varatchaya Wongteanchai in the final, 3–6, 6–0, 6–4.
Katharina Lehnert and Lavinia Tananta won the bronze medals.

Medalists

Seeds

Draw

Finals

Top half

Bottom half

External links
Draw

Women's Singles
Women's sports competitions in Singapore